The Piano Sonata in B-flat major, Hob. XVI/17, is a composition that was originally attributed to Joseph Haydn, but was later considered to have been written by an unknown composer, subsequently identified as Johann Gottfried Schwanenberger.

History 

The composition was discovered in Raigern Abbey, located in Brno, Czech Republic, by G. Feder. The work appears to be the product of Johann Gottfried Schwanenberger and not Joseph Haydn. The manuscript containing the composition is now housed in the Leoš Janáček Museum in Brno, Czech Republic.

Structure

The Sonata is in three movements:

 Allegro
 Andante
 Allegro

References 

Notes

Sources

External links 

Piano sonatas by Joseph Haydn
Compositions in B-flat major